KT Tunstall's Acoustic Extravaganza is a collection album by Scottish singer-songwriter KT Tunstall, originally released 15 May 2006 and was originally only available through her website. The CD comes with a DVD which includes the making of the album and features about her songs and her equipment, namely her AKAI E2 headrush loop pedal which is known as her "Wee Bastard".

The Acoustic Extravaganza version of "Universe & U" was featured in a season 2 episode, "Deterioration of the Fight or Flight Response" of Grey's Anatomy, and is featured in the Volume 2 Soundtrack.

"Golden Age" is a Beck cover from the 2002 album Sea Change.

The album carries a "Parental Advisory" label, as the words "ass" and "fuck" are present in its first track, "Ashes".

Track listing
CD
 "Ashes" – 3:34 (new song, released as a promo single)
 "Girl and the Ghost" – 4:14 (First released on the "Suddenly I See" single)
 "One Day" – 5:02 (First released on the "Black Horse and the Cherry Tree" single)
 "Golden Age" – 5:00 (Beck cover)
 "Boo Hoo" – 4:56 (First released on the "Other Side of the World" single)
 "Gone to the Dogs" – 3:59 (Featured on the demo album Tracks in July)
 "Change" – 3:44 (Featured on the demo album Tracks in July)
 "Miniature Disasters" – 4:32 (Acoustic version of song of debut album)
 "Universe & U" – 4:31 (Acoustic version of song of debut album/released on the "Another Place to Fall" single)
 "Throw Me a Rope" – 3:43 (Acoustic version of first single)

DVD
 "Five Go to Skye (Making the Album)"
 "Gone to the Dogs"
 "Throw Me a Rope"
 "The Wee Bastard Pedal"
 "Out-takes"

Personnel
 KT Tunstall — vocals, guitar
 Luke Bullen — drums, percussion, cajon
 Kenny Dickenson – trumpet, backing vocals, percussion, glockenspiel, Hammond organ, melodica
 Arnulf Lindner – double bass
 Sam Lewis – lead guitar
 Donna Maciocia – backing vocals – lead singer of Amplifico
 Chris Harley – shaker

Chart positions

References

External links
 KT Tunstall Official website
 Amplifico Official website

KT Tunstall albums
2006 albums
Albums produced by Steve Osborne